José Manuel Rivera "Poga" (born 1 January 1980) is a Spanish actor from Andalusia. He gained notoriety for his villain role playing Gandía in Money Heist.

Biography 
José Manuel Rivera "Poga" was born in Jerez de la Frontera on 1 January 1980. He made his television acting debut in 2007 as an extra in comedy television series La que se avecina. His performance in Orange Honey (2012) earned him a Best Actor nomination at the 2013 Andalusian Film Critics' Awards ASECAN.

He gained notoriety for his work in action thriller television series Money Heist, playing villainous César Gandía, the hateful, racist, homophobic, and violent chief security officer of the Bank of Spain.

Filmography

Film

Television

References 

Male actors from Andalusia
Spanish male television actors
Spanish male film actors
21st-century Spanish male actors

People from Jerez de la Frontera
1980 births

Living people